Aquilex is a genus of ground beetles in the family Carabidae. This genus has a single species, Aquilex diabolicola. It is found in Ecuador.

References

Migadopinae